Saint Andrew's Episcopal Church is a historic church at Sixth and Main Street (Arkansas Highway 9) in Mammoth Spring, Arkansas.  It is a single story wooden frame structure, with board-and-batten siding, a steeply-pitched gable roof, and lancet-arch windows, all characteristics of the Gothic Revival.  Built in 1888, it was moved about one block to its present location c. 1920.  It served its original congregation (founded in 1885) until the 1940s, and has since then been used as a clubhouse and community center.

The building was listed on the National Register of Historic Places in 1986.

See also
National Register of Historic Places listings in Fulton County, Arkansas

References

Churches completed in 1888
Episcopal church buildings in Arkansas
Churches on the National Register of Historic Places in Arkansas
Gothic Revival church buildings in Arkansas
Churches in Fulton County, Arkansas
19th-century Episcopal church buildings
National Register of Historic Places in Fulton County, Arkansas